Abraliopsis felis is a species of enoploteuthid cephalopod found in cool temperate water of the north Pacific Ocean. Female oocytes measure 1.5 mm in length.

References

Abraliopsis
Molluscs described in 1968